Échevin, also anglicized as eschevin, may refer to:

 Échevin (Belgium), a municipal office in present-day Belgium, usually known in English by its Dutch name schepen
 , a municipal office in medieval and early modern northern France
 Échevin (Luxembourg), a municipal office in present-day Luxembourg

See also
 Capitoul, the equivalent office in the city of Toulouse, France
 Consul, the equivalent office in most of southern France and Catalonia
 Jurat, the equivalent office in Bourdeaux, France
 Scabinus (disambiguation), the medieval office throughout Continental Europe